Cheveley Castle was a medieval fortified manor house near Cheveley, Cambridgeshire, England.

Details

Cheveley Castle was built by Sir John Pulteney, a merchant-financier and Lord Mayor of London, around 1341 on the outskirts of the village of Cheveley. The castle was built in an Edwardian style, with four circular towers, gatehouse and a bailey wall, on an elaborate moated site north-west of the village.  It is the only castle of its type to have been built in Cambridgeshire, and was probably intended less for defence than as a high-status hunting lodge - in the 14th century, Cheveley was at the centre of a deer park. The moat at Cheveley may have inspired other, similar moated designs across the eastern region.

The castle deteroriated after the early 17th-century, and today only limited masonry remains exist on the site, which is a scheduled monument.

See also
Castles in Great Britain and Ireland
List of castles in England

Bibliography
Creighton, Oliver Hamilton. (2005) Castles and Landscapes: Power, Community and Fortification in Medieval England. London: Equinox. .

References

Castles in Cambridgeshire